A. E. Burckhardt House is a registered historic building in Cincinnati, Ohio, that was listed in the National Register on March 3, 1980.  It was designed by Samuel Hannaford.

It was home of Bavarian-born furrier Adam Edward Burkhardt, who established his company in Cincinnati in 1866.

Notes

External links

Documentation from the University of Cincinnati
2018 Abandoned Photography By BluegrassPhotography.Net: http://www.bluegrassphotography.net/p1026424169

National Register of Historic Places in Cincinnati
Houses in Cincinnati
Houses on the National Register of Historic Places in Ohio
Victorian architecture in Ohio
Houses completed in 1887